[[File:Jacob More - Autoportrait.jpg|thumb|Self-portrait, 1783, Uffizi]]

Jacob More (1740–1793) was a Scottish landscape painter.

Biography
Jacob More was born in 1740 in Edinburgh. He studied landscape and decorative painting with James Norie's firm. He took the paintings of Gaspard Dughet and Claude Lorrain as his models.

By 1773 More had settled in Italy, and spent the rest of his life there; but he exhibited Italian landscapes at the Royal Academy in London in the 1780s.

In 1787 he was visited by Goethe, who considered his work 'admirably thought out'.

In 1791 he moved to Rome. In Italy he rivalled Jacob Philipp Hackert; and he befriended Allan Ramsay (1713-1784). In Rome he enjoyed a high reputation, and was commissioned to design a garden for the Villa Borghese in the Scottish landscape style.

Some paintings on view in Britain
 Mount Vesuvius in Eruption: The Last Days of Pompeii (1780), National Gallery of Scotland, Edinburgh
 The Falls of Clyde (Corra Linn), National Gallery of Scotland, Edinburgh ( a painting previously owned by Sir Joshua Reynolds)
 Bonnington Lynn, Fitzwilliam Museum, Cambridge
 Falls of the Clyde, Tate gallery, London
 The Good Samaritan, McManus Gallery, Dundee

Further reading
 P. R. Andrew, 'Jacob More, Biography and a Checklist of Works', in The Fifty-Fifth Volume of the Walpole Society (1989)
 J. Holloway, Jacob More 1740-1793'' (1987)

References 

1740 births
1793 deaths
18th-century Scottish painters
Scottish male painters
Artists from Edinburgh
Scottish landscape painters